Dora Stratou (born Dorothea Stratou; ; 1903–1988) was a significant contributor to Greek Folk Dancing and Greek Folk Music. She issued one of the largest series of folk music in the world with 50 records and is the founder of the Greek Dances-Dora Stratou Society.

Her parents Maria Koromila and Nikolaos Stratos brought her up in the upper class urban environment of Athens at the beginning of the twentieth century, along with her brother Andreas Stratos.

Dora Stratou wrote the book Greek Traditional Dances in 1979. It was printed by the Greek Educational Books Organisation in Athens 1979. She worked with Simon Karras and other ethnomusicologists. She maintained a record of traditions, recorded music, filmed dancers, interviewed villagers on dance topics, costumes, folklore, etc.

In her book she begins with the quote: I write what my eyes have seen, what went through my mind and what my soul fell in love with... Her true passion for Greek Dance led her to establish one of the most unusual living museums in the world, The Greek Dances Theatre in Athens. This theatre group dances the regional dances in Greece, the same way as they were done hundreds of years ago and the dancers still wear the authentic costumes of yesteryear. It is one of the finest living museums in Greece and unique in the world.

The Greek Dances theater is nowadays a host for other folkloric groups both within Greece and Internationally. The President's office of the International Dance Council CID UNESCO is also run from the main offices of the Dora Stratou Theatre in Plaka.

Filmography

Gallery

References 

1903 births
1988 deaths
Greek choreographers
Greek female dancers
Greek folklorists
Women folklorists
People from Athens